The 2013 Mercure Perth Masters were held from January 3 to 6 at the Dewars Centre in Perth, Scotland as part of the 2012–13 World Curling Tour. The event was held in a triple knockout format, and the purse for the event was GBP£17,160, of which the winner, Thomas Ulsrud, received GBP£6,000. Ulsrud defeated Mike McEwen of Canada in the final with a score of 7–2.

Teams
The teams are listed as follows:

Knockout results
The draw is listed as follows:

A event

B event

C event

Playoffs

References

External links

Mercure Perth Masters
Mercure Perth Masters
Mercure Perth Masters
Curling competitions in Scotland